General Chavchavadze may refer to:

Alexander Chavchavadze (1786–1846), Imperial Russian Army lieutenant general
Nikolay Zurabovich Chavchavadze (1830–1897), Imperial Russian Army adjutant general and General of the cavalry
Zakhary Gulbatovich Chavchavadze (1825–1905), Imperial Russian Army adjutant general and General of the cavalry